Yuliya Arturovna Aug (born 8 June 1970) is a Soviet and Russian actress. Her film credits include The Student, Ekaterina and Leto. Aug is part of the Gogol Center (theater of Kirill Serebrennikov) troupe.

Early life
Aug was born in Leningrad, RSFSR, Soviet Union, and spent her childhood in Narva, Estonian SSR. Her paternal grandfather was Estonian. In 1993, Yulia graduated from the Russian State Institute of Performing Arts and was accepted into the troupe of the Youth Theater named after A. A. Bryantsev, where she served for ten years, until 2004, playing eight main roles: Sophia in Woe from Wit, Mermaid in Pushkin's Mermaid, Lady Macbeth in Macbeth and others. In 2010 she graduated with honors from the directing department (remote learning) with a degree in Theater Directing of the Russian Institute of Theatre Arts in Moscow (workshop of Joseph Raihelgauz).

Selected filmography
Abduction of the Wizard (1989)
Ekaterina (2014)
The Student (2016)
Leto (2018)
Psycho (2020)
Compartment No. 6 (2021)
Hostel (2021)
Tchaikovsky's Wife (2022)

References

External links 
 

1970 births
20th-century Russian actresses
21st-century Russian actresses
Living people
Actresses from Saint Petersburg
High Courses for Scriptwriters and Film Directors alumni
Russian Academy of Theatre Arts alumni
Russian State Institute of Performing Arts alumni
Recipients of the Nika Award
Russian film actresses
Russian film directors
Russian music video directors
Russian screenwriters
Russian stage actresses
Russian theatre directors

Soviet film actresses
Russian activists against the 2022 Russian invasion of Ukraine